Hearts and Diamonds is a short American silent drama film produced by the Edison Company in 1912.

Release
Hearts and Diamonds was released in the United States on September 20, 1912.

References

External links
 

1912 films
1912 drama films
1912 short films
Silent American drama films
American black-and-white films
1910s English-language films
American silent short films
1910s American films